Eddy Snelders (born 9 April 1959) is a Belgian retired footballer who played as a defender.

External links
 
 
 

1959 births
Living people
Belgian footballers
Association football defenders
K.S.C. Lokeren Oost-Vlaanderen players
Royal Antwerp F.C. players
Lierse S.K. players
Standard Liège players
K.V. Kortrijk players
Beerschot A.C. players
Belgium international footballers
People from Kapellen, Belgium
Footballers from Antwerp Province